Samuel Joseph Austin (born 19 December 1996) is a footballer who plays as a winger for Notts County in the National League.

Career
Austin made his debut for Burton Albion in a 3–0 home defeat to Brighton & Hove Albion on 24 September 2013 in the League Cup. He made his League Two debut on 25 October 2014 in a 1–0 away defeat to Stevenage.

On Friday 20 November 2015, Austin joined National League North side AFC Telford United on loan until January 2016. He was released by Burton Albion at the end of the 2015–16 season. 

Austin joined Kidderminster Harriers on a one-year deal ahead of the 2016-17 season, following his departure from Burton. He signed an 18-month extension in January 2018.  Following the appointment of Russ Penn and Jimmy O'Connor, Austin began playing in more forward positions, as opposed to his typical position of right-back. In February 2022, Austin signed another extension, keeping him at Kidderminster until 2023. Austin was named in the National League North 2021-22 Team of the Season.

On 24 June 2022, Austin joined National League club Notts County for an undisclosed fee on a three-year deal, joining the club alongside Kidderminster teammate Geraldo Bajrami.

Career statistics

Honours
Kidderminster Harriers
National League North 2021-22 Team of the Season

References

External links

1996 births
Living people
English footballers
Association football forwards
Burton Albion F.C. players
AFC Telford United players
Kidderminster Harriers F.C. players
Notts County F.C. players
English Football League players
National League (English football) players